Tena Šikić (born 4 July 1994) is a Croatian judoka.

She is the bronze medallist of the 2016 Judo Grand Prix Tashkent in the -52 kg category.

References

External links
 

1994 births
Living people
Croatian female judoka
21st-century Croatian women